The 1957 New York Giants season involved the team finishing in sixth place in the National League with a 69–85 record, 26 games behind the NL and World Champion Milwaukee Braves. It was the team's 75th and final season in New York City before its relocation to San Francisco, California for the following season. The last game at their stadium, the Polo Grounds, was played on September 29 against the Pittsburgh Pirates.

Offseason 
 October 26, 1956: Hank Sauer was signed as a free agent by the Giants.
 February 21, 1957: Manny Mota was signed as an amateur free agent by the Giants.
 February 26, 1957: Hoyt Wilhelm was traded by the Giants to the St. Louis Cardinals for Whitey Lockman.
 March 27, 1957: Bill Sarni was released by the Giants.
 Prior to 1957 season: John Orsino was signed as an amateur free agent by the Giants.

Regular season

Relocation to San Francisco 
While seeking a new stadium to replace the crumbling Polo Grounds, the Giants began to contemplate a move from New York, initially considering Metropolitan Stadium in Minneapolis–St. Paul, which was home to their top farm team, the Minneapolis Millers. Under the rules of the time, the Giants' ownership of the Millers gave them priority rights to a major league team in the area.

At this time, the Giants were approached by San Francisco mayor George Christopher. Despite objections from shareholders such as Joan Whitney Payson (who later owned the expansion Mets), majority owner Horace Stoneham entered into negotiations with San Francisco officials around the same time that Dodgers' owner Walter O'Malley was courting the city of Los Angeles. O'Malley had been told that the Dodgers would not be allowed to move to Los Angeles unless a second team moved to California as well. He pushed Stoneham toward relocation. In the summer of 1957, both the New York Giants and the Brooklyn Dodgers announced their moves to California, and the golden age of baseball in the New York area ended.

Season standings

Record vs. opponents

Notable transactions 
 April 16, 1957: Dick Littlefield and Bob Lennon were traded by the Giants to the Chicago Cubs for Ray Katt and Ray Jablonski.
 June 15, 1957: Red Schoendienst was traded by the Giants to the Milwaukee Braves for Danny O'Connell, Ray Crone, and Bobby Thomson.

Roster

Player stats

Batting

Starters by position 
Note: Pos = Position; G = Games played; AB = At bats; H = Hits; Avg. = Batting average; HR = Home runs; RBI = Runs batted in

Other batters 
Note: G = Games played; AB = At bats; H = Hits; Avg. = Batting average; HR = Home runs; RBI = Runs batted in

Pitching

Starting pitchers 
Note: G = Games pitched; IP = Innings pitched; W = Wins; L = Losses; ERA = Earned run average; SO = Strikeouts

Other pitchers 
Note: G = Games pitched; IP = Innings pitched; W = Wins; L = Losses; ERA = Earned run average; SO = Strikeouts

Relief pitchers 
Note: G = Games pitched; W = Wins; L = Losses; SV = Saves; ERA = Earned run average; SO = Strikeouts

Awards and honors

League leaders 
 Willie Mays, National League leader, triples, (20).

Farm system

Notes

References 
 1957 New York Giants team at Baseball-Reference
 1957 New York Giants at Baseball Almanac

New York Giants (NL)
San Francisco Giants seasons
New York Giants season
1957 in sports in New York City
1950s in Manhattan
Washington Heights, Manhattan